Ragnar Emil Rygel (25 May 1930 – 13 September 1999) was a Norwegian ice hockey player, born in Asker, Norway. He played for the Norwegian national ice hockey team, and  participated at the Winter Olympics in 1952, where the Norwegian team placed 9th.

He also played football, and made two appearances for the Norway national team in 1954.

References

External links

1930 births
1999 deaths
Association football midfielders
Frisk Asker Ishockey players
Ice hockey players at the 1952 Winter Olympics
Norwegian ice hockey players
Olympic ice hockey players of Norway
People from Asker
Norwegian footballers
Norway international footballers
Sportspeople from Viken (county)